National Secondary Route 219, or just Route 219 (or ) is a National Road Route of Costa Rica, located in the Cartago province.

Description
It is the main access to Irazú Volcano National Park, it is possible from Route 219 to take Route 417 which is the main access to Turrialba Volcano National Park.

In Cartago province the route covers Cartago canton (Carmen, San Nicolás districts), Alvarado canton (Pacayas district), Oreamuno canton (San Rafael, Cot, Potrero Cerrado, Santa Rosa districts).

References

Highways in Costa Rica